Rangikaiamokura Wirihana Hetet  (born 18 April 1937) is a Maori master carver (tohunga whakairo) of Ngāti Tuwharetoa and Ngāti Maniapoto descent.

Early life and family
Hetet was born in 1937 to Charles Wilson Hetet and Lillian (née Smallman). He married Erenora Puketapu at Waiwhetu Marae in 1960, and they have four children. Their daughter Veranoa Hetet is a notable weaver.

Carving
Hetet first rose to recognition in New Zealand as one of the carvers of the meeting house at Waiwhetū in the 1950s, during which he met Erenora Puketapu-Hetet, who become his wife. His grandmother, Rangimārie Hetet was a renowned weaver from Te Kuiti, who passed her skills on to Erenora Puketapu-Hetet.

Hetet trained in fraternity of carvers known as Konae Aronui under legendary tohunga whakairo Tuhaka Kapua and later Hone Taiapa at the New Zealand Māori Arts and Crafts Institute. He had only two apprentices, including Sam Hauwaho.

As his wife did, Hetet sees his art as having a spiritual dimension:
The carver Rangi Hetet says that the materials he uses are no simply materials—they have a spiritual nature, being descended from Tane. A carver should show respect for Tane by not carving in too flamboyantly a manner; he should, of course, inject his own mauri into the work, but should do so for the sake of the work, not his own sake. Hetet tries to use raw timber rather than milled timber so as to be able to show respect by following the nature of character of the timber.

Hetet's commissions have included a number of meeting houses, four waka taua (war canoes 60+ feet long) and a number of institutional pieces such as the one at LINZ. 
One of Hetet's 1989 sesquicentenary canoes was subsequently involved in a legal stoush.

In the 2004 New Year Honours he was appointed an Officer of the New Zealand Order of Merit for services as a Māori master carver.

He is still active and exhibiting in venues such as the Māori Art Market.

References

1937 births
Living people
Ngāti Tūwharetoa people
Tohunga
New Zealand Māori carvers
New Zealand Māori weavers
Ngāti Maniapoto people
Officers of the New Zealand Order of Merit
Atkinson–Hursthouse–Richmond family